Rafael Acevedo (1960-) is a Puerto Rican poet, novelist, playwright and professor of literature. He was editor of the journal Filo de juego (1983-1987), one of the most important publications of the poets of the '80s Generation (Spanish: Generación de Poetas de los Ochenta) movement. Like some other Puerto Rican writers of the late 20th and early 21st century, his work is highly imaginative and not strongly tied to the independence movement.

Early life 
Rafael Acevedo was born in Santurce, San Juan, Puerto Rico.

Poetry 
Acevedo has published six books of poetry:
 Contracanto de los superdecidores (1982)
 El retorno del ojo pródigo (1986)
 Libro de islas (1989) 
 instrumentario (1996)
 La Moneda de Sal (2006) "Salt Money"
 Elegía Franca (2014)

His poems have been included in several anthologies:
 Antología de poesía puertorriqueña (1993)
 Mal(h)ab(l)ar (1996)
 El límite volcado (2000)
 Los nuevos caníbales, vol. 2: la más reciente poesía del Caribe hispano (2003)

Several of Acevedo's poems have been translated into English:
 "Of Cannibals", "Typology"
 "Silent Dragon"
 "Mirror" and "Measuring Instruments"

Science fiction 
His novel Exquisito cadáver won an award from Casa de las Américas in 2001.

Along with Professor Melanie Pérez Ortiz, Acevedo helped to host the First Congress of Science Fiction and Fantasy Literature of the Caribbean at the University of Puerto Rico in 2014.

Theatrical works 
Acevedo has written plays, including the following:
 Tres pájaros en una rama (1990)
 Crónica natural (1991)
 Aló quién llama (1994)

References 

1960 births
Puerto Rican male writers
Puerto Rican poets
Living people